The bucentaur (bucintoro in Italian and Venetian) was the ceremonial barge of the doges of Venice. It was used every year on Ascension Day (Festa della Sensa) up to 1798 to take the doge out to the Adriatic Sea to perform the "Marriage of the Sea" – a ceremony that symbolically wedded Venice to the sea.

Scholars believe there were four major barges, the first significant bucentaur having been built in 1311. The last and most magnificent of the historic bucentaurs made its maiden voyage in 1729 in the reign of Doge Alvise III Sebastiano Mocenigo. A two-deck floating palace, its main salon had a seating capacity of 90. The doge's throne was in the stern, and the prow bore a figurehead representing Justice with sword and scales. The barge was propelled by 168 oarsmen, and another 40 sailors were required to man it.

The ship was destroyed in 1798 on Napoleon's orders to symbolize his victory in conquering Venice. In February 2008, the Fondazione Bucintoro announced a €20 million project to rebuild the 1729 bucentaur. Work started on 15 March, 2008 at the Arsenale shipyard and naval dock.

Origin of the name
It has also been suggested that the vessel was named after the ship  referred to by Virgil when describing the funeral rites observed by Aeneas to honour his father's death; the bucentaur was twice the size of the ship mentioned in the Aeneid. The name may also refer to the trumpets and horns that were played on board. The common supposition was that the name derived from a creature of a man with the head of an ox, a figure of which served as the barge's figurehead. This derivation is, however, fanciful; the word  is unknown in Greek mythology, and representations of the "figurehead" of the bucentaurs in fact depict the Lion of Saint Mark.

The name "bucentaur" seems, indeed, to have been given to any great and sumptuous Venetian vessels. Du Cange quotes from the chronicle of the Doge Andrea Dandolo: " [... with a well-wrought and stately Bucentaur, upon which he came to San Clemente, where a more important and more stately Bucentaur had already arrived with his advisors, etc. ...]".

The term was also used to describe a 16th-century sumptuous transport boat, built and decorated in Modena, to celebrate the marriage of Lucrezia, the daughter of Ercole II d'Este, Duke of Ferrara, to the Duke of Urbino.

The vessels
Before the age of the bucentaurs, it is probable that for ceremonies in the Venetian Lagoon the doge was simply assigned a small galley from the Venetian fleet. As Venice's wealth increased due to its naval power, plans were made for a special ship to be built. This is evidenced by the promissioni – sacramental pledges spoken by the doges when they were sworn into office – of Reniero Zeno of 1252, Lorenzo Tiepolo of 1268 and Giovanni Soranzo of 1312 which mention the construction of a bucentaur in the Arsenale shipyard and naval depot.

The 1311 bucentaur
Historians agree that four major barges were built. While there are believed to have been earlier vessels, the bucentaur of 1311 is regarded as the first significant one, for on 17 August 1311 the promissione was amended to add the statement "quod Bucentaurus Domini ducis fiat per Dominium et teneatur in Arsenatu" ("... that a Bucentaur should be made for the Lord Doge for his rule, and it should be held in the Arsenale"). This was the first time that Venetian law had provided that the expense of building the bucentaur was to be borne by the public budget. The two-decked bucentaur had a tiemo (canopy) with two sections, one in purple velvet for the doge, the other in red velvet for Venetian nobles. The historian Marino Sanuto the Younger, in his work De origine, situ et magistratibus urbis Venetae (On the Origin, Site and Officials of the City of Venice), also described the ship as bearing a sculpture of Justice.

The bucentaur was used not only for the Marriage of the Sea ceremony, but also for other state functions such as festivals celebrating the Virgin Mary and the bearing of newly crowned dogaressas (the wives of doges) to the Doge's Palace. On 6 May 1401, a law was passed to prohibit the doge from making private use of the bucentaur.

Documents mention the construction of another bucentaur in 1449 larger than the 1311 one, but little is known about this vessel. The earliest known image of a bucentaur appeared in Jacopo de' Barbari's monumental woodcut Pianta di Venezia (Map of Venice) which was published in 1500. This work pictured a bucentaur afloat in the Arsenale without oars or decoration save for a large wooden sculpture of Justice in the bow. A similar illustration was produced by Andrea Valvassore between 1517 and 1525.

The 1526 bucentaur
On 10 May 1526, Marino Sanuto the Younger recorded that on "Ascension Day the serenissimo [the Most Serene One – the doge] went in the new bucintoro to wed the sea", adding that "it was a beautiful work, larger and wider than the other one". The proportions and rich decoration of this Bucentaur, built in the reign of Doge Andrea Gritti, became the model for successive versions of the ship. It had two decks and 42 oars, and was adorned with figures of lions with a sculpture of Justice at the prow (preserved in the Museum of Naval History in Venice). The movable canopy of the vessel was covered with red fabric on the outside, and blue fabric with gold stars inside.

This bucentaur was frequently referred to in Venetian chronicles. It was on the ship that in July 1574 Henry III of France was conveyed with the doge down the Grand Canal to the Ca' Foscari where he stayed during his visit to Venice. The ship was also used to transport the newly crowned Dogaressa Morosina Morosini-Grimani to the Doge's Palace on 4 May 1597. This event was the subject of numerous etchings and paintings by Giacomo Franco, Andrea Vicentino, Sebastian Vrancx and anonymous artists.

The 1606 bucentaur

Despite Venice's economic and maritime decline, in 1601 at the behest of the Doge Marino Grimani, the Venetian Senate decided to have a new bucentaur built at the cost of 70,000 ducats; although the existing one was still in service, experts regarded it as too old. The designer of the new ship is unknown, but he was selected from among the most qualified marangoni (ships' carpenters) of the Arsenale. The work was supervised by Marco Antonio Memmo, the sovraprovveditore (overseer of the provveditore) of the Arsenale. The new vessel was approved and praised by all on its maiden voyage to the Lido with the newly elected Doge Leonardo Donato on Ascension Day, 10 May 1606.

The third barge was modelled after its predecessors, its decorations influenced by late-Renaissance forms. Contemporary illustrations show that the sides of the bucentaur were covered by mythical figures of sirens riding seahorses, and that the loggias were supported by curved dolphins amongst intertwined garlands and scrollwork taking on the form of monstrous hydras extending from the ends of the two bow spurs. It was once believed that most of the wooden sculptures, including a large sculpture of Mars, two lions of St. Mark positioned on either side of the stern, and the figurehead of Justice (dressed in apparel made by the San Daniele Monastery), were the work of  the renowned Venetian sculptor Alessandro Vittoria, but research has revealed the names of the brothers Agostino and Marcantonio Vanini of Bassano who were praised as "authors of carvings of marvellous beauty". After more than a century of service, in 1719 a decision was made to demolish the ship.

The 1727 bucentaur
The last and most magnificent of the historic bucentaurs was commissioned by the Senate in 1719, and the construction of it began in the Arsenale in 1722. The ship was designed by Michele Stefano Conti, the protomagistro dei marangoni (head master of the ships' carpenters). Wooden sculpting work was assigned to Antonio Corradini, as was testified by the phrase "Antonii Coradini sculptoris Inventum" ("invention of the sculptor Antonio Corradini") inscribed near the bow palmette. He was an established sculptor, having already worked on commissions in Austria, Bohemia and Saxony. The gilding, in pure gold leaf, was handled by one Zuanne D'Adamo. Some of the 1606 ship's ornaments and sculptures, including the sculpture of Mars and the two lions of St. Mark, were salvaged and reused. A two-deck floating palace, its main salon was covered in red velvet, had 48 windows set in a huge, elaborately carved baldacchino or canopy, and had a seating capacity of 90. The doge's throne was in the stern, and the prow bore the traditional figurehead representing Justice with sword and scales. The barge was propelled by 168 oarsmen rowing in teams of four on its 42 oars each  in length; another 40 sailors were required to man it. Only the most handsome and sturdy youths of the Arsenale were selected for the ship's crew. The new bucentaur made its début on Ascension Day 1729 in the reign of Doge Alvise III Sebastiano Mocenigo. The event was officially recorded, and the splendour of the vessel praised with sonnets and publications such as that by Antonio Maria Lucchini entitled La Nuova regia su l'acque nel Bucintoro nuovamente eretto all'annua solenne funzione del giorno dell'Ascensione di Nostro Signore (The New Palace upon the Waters of the Newly Built Bucentaur at the Annual Solemn Function of the Day of the Ascension of Our Lord, 1751).

The German writer Johann Wolfgang von Goethe, in his work Italienischen Reise (Italian Journey, 1816–1817) which was an account of his travels in Italy between 1786 and 1787, described the bucentaur on 5 October 1786 in these terms:

In 1798, Napoleon ordered this bucentaur to be destroyed, less for the sake of its golden decorations than as a political gesture to symbolize his victory in conquering the city. French soldiers broke up the carved wooden portions and the gold decorations of the ship into small pieces, carted them to the island of San Giorgio Maggiore and set fire to them to recover the gold. The ship burned for three days, and French soldiers used 400 mules to carry away its gold. The decorative elements of the vessel that survived the flames are preserved in the Museo Civico Correr in Venice, and there is a detailed scale model of the vessel in the Arsenale. The hull survived and, renamed the Prama Hydra and armed with four cannons, was stationed at the mouth of the Lido's port where it served as a coastal battery. Subsequently, the ship was returned to the Arsenale and used as a prison ship until it was entirely destroyed in 1824.
Admiral Amilcare Paulucci had the engineer Giovanni Casoni make a 1:10 scale model of the 1727 Bucentaur before it was destroyed. The model is currently kept at the Naval History Museum in Venice.

Marriage of the Sea ceremony

The "Marriage of the Adriatic", or more correctly "Marriage of the Sea" (in Italian, Sposalizio del Mare), was a ceremony symbolizing the maritime dominion of Venice. The ceremony, established about 1000 to commemorate the Doge Pietro II Orseolo's conquest of Dalmatia, was originally one of supplication and placation, Ascension Day being chosen as that on which the doge set out on his expedition. The form it took was a solemn procession of boats, headed by the doge's nave (ship), from 1311 the Bucentaur, out to sea by the Lido port.

Modern reconstruction

In February 2008, plans to rebuild the bucentaur destroyed in 1798 were announced. More than 200 shipbuilders, woodcarvers and jewelers started work on 15 March, 2008 at the Arsenale. It has been reported by the Italian press that it will take two years for the bucentaur to be constructed. However, Colonel Giorgio Paterno, the head of Fondazione Bucintoro which is behind the €20 million project, said in March 2008 that "[w]e'll build it as fast as we can but we're not in a hurry." It is intended that the project will make use of traditional shipbuilding techniques and original materials, including larch and fir wood, and will reproduce gold decorations. The foundation is supported by businessmen in the Veneto and Lombardy regions but has also written to the French President Nicolas Sarkozy for France to make a financial contribution as a goodwill gesture to compensate for Napoleon's "vandalism" of the 1729 vessel.

Fondazione Bucintoro hopes that the vessel will become "the most visited floating museum in the world", but also sees the project as a means to "help Venice recover its former glory and its old spirit". According to Paterno, "Invaded by so many million tourists, the city risks losing its identity, losing its cultural connection with its own history. It's not enough to live in the future, the city needs to connect with and remember its glorious past."

See also
History of the Republic of Venice
Italy in the Middle Ages
The Doge on the Bucintoro near the Riva di Sant'Elena, an oil on canvas by Francesco Guardi

Notes

References

.
.
Official website of the Fondazione Bucintoro. Retrieved on 29 February 2008.
.

Further reading

Articles
.

Books
 (Italian and French).
 (Italian).
Lina Urban – Il Bucintoro – Centro Internazionale Grafica Veneziana, Venice 1988: (Italian)

External links

 Homepage of the Fondazione Bucintoro

Barges
Republic of Venice
Medieval ships
Early Modern Italy
Ships of the Venetian navy
Ships built by the Venetian Arsenal